The Midland Railway Johnson 0-6-0 were a class of locomotives serving Britain's Midland Railway system in the late 19th and early 20th centuries.  Between 1875 and 1908 the Midland Railway, under the control of locomotive superintendents Samuel Waite Johnson and Richard Deeley, ordered 935 goods tender engines of 0-6-0 type, both from the railway's own shops at Derby and various external suppliers.  Although there were many (mostly small) variations between different batches both as delivered and as successively rebuilt, all 935 can be regarded as a single series, one of the largest classes of engine on Britain's railways.  The locomotives served as late as 1964, but none of them now survive.

Builders

They were built at the following plants:

Boilers

The H and H1 boilers fitted to the "2736" and "3815" classes were larger, having a diameter of 4 ft 8 in rather than 4 ft 1 in, and a longer firebox, which made the engines more powerful. While these were being built there started a program of rebuilding many of the earlier engines (but not the first 2 classes) with the "H" boiler to increase their power.  By 1915, 380 engines had been so upgraded, giving 450 with "H" and 485 with "B".

Beginning in 1916 engines were rebuilt with Belpaire boilers. Those from the first two classes ("1142" & "1357"), (none of which had received an "H") received the smaller "G6" type boiler (similar size to the "B"), the remainder the larger "G7" size (similar size to the "H").  The "H" & "G7" boilered engines were classed "3" (later "3F") and those with "B" & "G6" boilers were classed "2" (later "2F").

By 1925, production of the new superheated 4F 0-6-0s meant there was no shortage of goods engines of this power class, and from that point only "G6" boilers were installed on rebuilding, sometimes on engines which had previously had "H" boilers, reducing them back to class 2.  Three of the later examples were experimentally fitted with superheaters from 1923 to 1928, but generally the class remained saturated throughout.  One hundred and thirteen engines remained with their original "B" boilers until scrapped, 22 had "H" boilers, 432 had "G7" and 368 had "G6".

Dimensions

As built

The smaller driving wheels gave an enhanced tractive effort at the expense of reduced speed, which was useful on coal (and other mineral) trains.

Later dimensions

Use on joint lines

Sixteen engines of the "M" class were bought by the Midland and Great Northern Joint Railway, eight in 1896 and eight in 1899, which were numbered 58–73. All were built with Class "B" boilers ( diameter over the largest ring, round-top firebox), and replacement boilers were normally of the same type; but two (nos. 62 and 69) were rebuilt in 1906 and 1909 with the larger Class "H" boiler ( diameter over the largest ring, round-top). In 1921, two others (nos. 68 and 71) were rebuilt with the Belpaire Class "G7" boiler ( diameter, Belpaire firebox) together with longer smokeboxes, which required the main frames to be extended at both front and rear. The two already fitted with Class "H" boilers received "G7" boilers and frame extensions in 1923 and 1928. All 16 were acquired by the London and North Eastern Railway (LNER) on 1 October 1936 and new numbers 058–073 were allocated, but five (nos. 63, 66, 67, 68, 72) were considered to be worn out and withdrawn in 1936–37, and three of these (nos. 66, 67, 72) did not receive their LNER numbers. The remaining eleven were added to LNER book stock in 1937 and classified J40 if fitted with the Class "B" boiler, or J41 if fitted with the Class "G7" boiler. Withdrawal of these 11 began in 1938, and by the time that the LNER renumbering scheme was prepared in June 1943, there were five left, nos. 059, 064, 065, 070 and 071. These were allotted numbers 4100–4, but none lasted long enough to be renumbered: the last, no. 059, was withdrawn in June 1944.

Ten engines of "M" class were bought by the Somerset and Dorset Joint Railway in 1896 and 1902, numbered 62–66 and 72–76. All ended up with "G7" boilers and were taken into LMS stock as class 3F in 1930. The 10 locos were assigned odd numbers between 3194 and 3260 in other batches of the locos, which had become vacant due to withdrawls.

Numbering

LMS
The class all retained their numbers when they passed to the London, Midland and Scottish Railway (LMS) at the 1923 grouping, but in 1934 2900–2984 (all class 2F) had 20000 added to their numbers to make way for newer locomotives. The same happened to 3000–3019 in 1947.

British Railways
At nationalisation those that were class 3F, along with other LMS locomotives, had 40000 added to their numbers by British Railways, but the class 2Fs were reorganised into a new series 58114–58310.

Accidents and incidents
On 1 December 1900, locomotive No. 1433 was hauling a freight train when it was derailed at Peckwash, Derbyshire, possibly after the driver lost control and the train ran away.
The locomotive was subsequently scrapped.

Withdrawal
Withdrawal of the engines from service began in 1925, starting with unrebuilt engines, and continued until 1964. Despite the large number of locomotives of the class and their late survival, none were preserved.

SM&JR farewell tour
No. 43222 hauled the Stephenson Locomotive Society's SM&JR railtour on 29 April 1956. It carried the reporting number M500.

Gallery

 See also

References 

 
 

Midland Railway locomotives
0-6-0 locomotives
Beyer, Peacock locomotives
Dübs locomotives
Kitson locomotives
Neilson locomotives
Robert Stephenson and Company locomotives
Sharp Stewart locomotives
Vulcan Foundry locomotives
Railway locomotives introduced in 1875
Scrapped locomotives
Standard gauge steam locomotives of Great Britain